Sri Srinivasa Kalyana, is 1974 Kannada-language Hindu mythological film directed by Vijay. The film which is based on lord Venkateswara, stars Rajkumar, B. Saroja Devi and Manjula. It also featured the first screen appearances of future actors and Rajkumar's sons, Shiva Rajkumar and Raghavendra Rajkumar. The movie was dubbed in Tamil as Ezhumalaiyan Dharisanam and in Telugu as Sri Tirupatikshetra Mahatyam (1977).

Cast

 Rajkumar as Lord Venkateswara
 B. Saroja Devi as Goddess Lakshmi
 Manjula as Padmavathi
 Rajashankar as Hathiram Bhavaji
 Srinath as Narada
 Sampath as Padmavathi's father
 Vajramuni as Bhrigu
 H. Ramachandra Shastry as Chief priest at the Balaji Temple
 Jokey Shyam
 Bhatti Mahadevappa
 Shani Mahadevappa
 Raghavan
 Suryakumar
 Bheema Rao
 Kunigal Nagabhushan
 Keshava
 Honnavalli Krishna
 Thipatur Siddaramaiah
 Advani Lakshmi Devi as Bakuladevi, Srinivasa's mother
 M. Jayashree as Padmavathi's mother
 Pramila Joshai as Vasantha, friend of Padmavathi
 B. Jaya
 Indra Jorge
 Pushpa
 Rajani
 Sushila Naidu
 Lakshmi Janardhan
 Shantha
 Bharani
 Thoogudeepa Srinivas as Ravana
 Dr. Chandru 
 B. V. Radha 
 Shiva Rajkumar (credited as Master Puttaswamy)
 Raghavendra Rajkumar (credited as Master Raghavendra)
 Ramaraj (credited as Master Ramaraj)
 Poornima (credited as Baby Poornima)

Soundtrack

The music of the film was composed by the duo Rajan–Nagendra, with lyrics penned by Chi. Udayashankar and Chi. Sadashivaiah.

References

1974 films
Hindu mythological films
1970s Kannada-language films
Films scored by Rajan–Nagendra
Films with screenplays by Chi. Udayashankar
Films directed by Vijay (director)